Rhiginia cruciata, commonly known as the scarlet-bordered assassin bug or cruciate assassin bug, is a species of millipede assassin in the family Reduviidae. It is found in the Caribbean, Central America, and North America.

References

 Thomas J. Henry, Richard C. Froeschner. (1988). Catalog of the Heteroptera, True Bugs of Canada and the Continental United States. Brill Academic Publishers.

Further reading

 Arnett, Ross H. (2000). American Insects: A Handbook of the Insects of America North of Mexico. CRC Press.

External links

 NCBI Taxonomy Browser, Rhiginia cruciata

Reduviidae
Insects described in 1832